Owen Price (born 20 October 1986) is an English former professional footballer who played as a midfielder. He is currently an assistant manager with Erith & Belvedere.

Club career
Price played in the system of Charlton Athletic, prior to being signed by Tottenham Hotspur in 1999; having impressed in a youth cup final, aged fourteen, at Arsenal's Highbury, scoring after 4.2 seconds which was named as a Guinness World Record. A year after signing, Tottenham and Charlton went to a tribunal after disagreements arose in regards to compensation for Price. In 2006, despite having years remaining on his Tottenham contract, Price went to Sweden after penning a deal with GIF Sundsvall of the Superettan. A move to Finland's TPS arrived in 2007, with the midfielder making pro appearances in the Veikkausliiga.

Later in 2007, Price moved back to Sweden with Ljungskile SK; where he reunited with David Wilson, who was his manager at GIF Sundsvall. Price returned to England in 2008, signing with Northwich Victoria. He featured in Conference fixtures against Rushden & Diamonds and Altrincham in December. He was with Farnborough between 2009 and 2011, which preceded a two-year stint with Lewes before he returned to Farnborough for the 2013–14 Conference South. Price then spent time with Carshalton Athletic, Cray Wanderers and, on loan, Erith Town. Price joined Greenwich Borough in July 2016; lasting three months.

Price signed for Hythe Town from Chatham Town in January 2017. He played for Phoenix Sports later that year. As he came off a spell as player-coach with Erith & Belvedere, Price agreed terms for the same role with Southern Counties East Football League Division One's Lewisham Borough in 2018. That move came via a stay with Rochester United. He went into coaching in June 2019. Despite becoming assistant manager with Lordswood, Price was named as a substitute for their FA Cup qualifying defeat to Steyning Town on 10 August; he didn't come on, but was sent off following a melee between the two benches.

International career
Soon after joining Tottenham Hotspur, Price was called up by the England Schoolboys team.

Coaching career
Having had staff roles whilst playing with Erith & Belvedere and Lewisham Borough, Price moved into a sole management role in June 2019 after joining Darren Anslow's staff at Lordswood as an assistant manager. He left in May 2020, a month prior to his coaching return to Erith & Belvedere under Del Oldfield; a club he made fifteen appearances in all competitions for back in 2017.

Personal life
Price attended Ernest Bevin College, alongside Cherno Samba. Early in his career, Price signed a sponsorship deal with Adidas.

Career statistics

References

External links

1986 births
Living people
Footballers from Tooting
English footballers
Association football midfielders
English expatriate footballers
Expatriate footballers in Sweden
Expatriate footballers in Finland
English expatriate sportspeople in Sweden
English expatriate sportspeople in Finland
Veikkausliiga players
National League (English football) players
Isthmian League players
GIF Sundsvall players
Turun Palloseura footballers
Ljungskile SK players
Northwich Victoria F.C. players
Farnborough F.C. players
Lewes F.C. players
Carshalton Athletic F.C. players
Cray Wanderers F.C. players
Erith Town F.C. players
Greenwich Borough F.C. players
Chatham Town F.C. players
Hythe Town F.C. players
Phoenix Sports F.C. players
Erith & Belvedere F.C. players
Rochester United F.C. players
Lewisham Borough F.C. players